

Standings

Brunei vs Vietnam
In the first game of the tournament it was Vietnam who opened the scoring midway through the first half when an unmarked Lê Thanh Bình poked in Hồ Ngọc Thắng's cross. Vietnam would score again just after the break in similar circumstances as Trần Phi Sơn was once again unmarked to head in Nguyễn Công Phượng's free kick. Vietnam would score four times in the last 15 minutes as the Brunei side tired, first Mạc Hồng Quân finished after a teammate headed the ball down to him, then Ngọc Thắng and Hồng Quân exchanged some neat passes before the former's cross hit into the net by Phạm Đức Huy. Four minutes later Ngọc Thắng's cross was not properly dealt with by the Bruneian defense resulting in Hồng Quân laying the ball off for Công Phượng to score, and with a minute left in normal time Phạm Mạnh Hùng's effort from outside the box was beyond the goalkeeper's reach to complete the rout.

Laos vs Thailand
Thailand bossed the early stages of the game, and finally broke the deadlock in only 10 minutes as Narubadin Weerawatnodom headed home fellow defender Peerapat Notechaiya's corner. Nine minutes later Thai play-maker Chanathip Songkrasin found Pinyo Inpinit with a fine reverse-pass which the latter put on a plate for Chananan Pombuppha, who couldn't miss. Seven minutes before half time Peerapat broke down the flank and his cross was powerfully dispatched by Nurul Sriyankem. Just a minute after the break Peerapat claimed his third assist of the game as his corner was headed in by Chananan. At the hour mark Nurul was adjudged to have been fouled by Sengdao Inthilath in the box and Chananan confidently scored the penalty kick to complete his hat-trick. The sixth Thai goal came through some lovely interplay between the substitutes ended with Tristan Do floating a fine cross over the Laotian goalkeeper and left Chananan with the task of heading into the empty net for his fourth goal of the game. To their credit Laos never gave up and had too great chances, one in the 35 minute when Thai goaltender Chanin Sae-Eae had to pull off a diving save to keep out Soukaphone Vongchiengkham's effort, and in the 51 when substitute Maitee's shot went just over.

Malaysia vs Timor-Leste
Malaysia took the lead in only the eleventh minute as Nurridzuan Abu Hassan cross was missed by several players although it fell to midfielder D. Saarvindran who effortlessly scored. Muhammad Syafiq Ahmad had a great opportunity to double the lead three minutes later when a defensive slip up let him through on goal although his shot was deflected for a corner. Thirteen minutes before half time Malaysian midfielder Nazmi Faiz Mansor was shown a straight red card for allegedly spitting at an opponent in an off the ball situation. Chances were few and far between in the second half as 10 man Malaysia were hesitant to take chances and Timor-Leste could not break through their defence. In the seventy third minute the two Malaysian substitutes combined well, with Nazirul Naim Che Hashim's corner being headed against the bar by S. Kumaahran. Timor-Leste's best chance came five minutes from time as Mohd Farhan Abu Bakar had to dive at full stretch to make a superb save from captain Anggisu's free kick.

Brunei vs Laos
Laos dominated the early stages of the game with their play-makers Khonesavanh Sihavong and Soukaphone Vongchiengkham causing the Bruneian defence all sorts of problems. In only the eleventh minute when the former found Phoutthasay Khochalern outside the box who unleashed a well place shot to score the first goal of the game. Despite the early dominance by Laos, Brunei grew into the game and had several good opportunities fall to their captain and former Arsenal and Chelsea academy player Faiq Jefri Bolkiah. In the 19th minute he dribbled past two defenders to see his shot go just wide, while three minutes later the Laotian goalkeeper had to be alert to his well placed free-kick. Faiq Jefri was desperately unlucky in the 32nd minute when his fine run and shot had Soukthavy Soundala beaten but his effort rebounded off the post. It was Laos' turn to hit the word work ten minutes later with Sihavong and Soukaphone coming well again but the former's effort coming back of the underside of the crossbar. In the 55th minute Bruneian goalkeeper Ahsanuddin had to make a fantastic one handed save from Phoutthasay's long range effort, and again ten minutes later from Khouanta Sivongthong. Brunei finally got their equaliser in the 67th minute when a quick counterattack ended with Azwan Ali Rahman placing a shot into the top corner. Parity would only last seven minutes though as Soukchinda Natphasouk got behind the Bruneian defence to turn in Soukaphone's low cross. The Laotians held on for the win in a fine match.

Thailand vs Timor-Leste
A surprisingly resolute Timorese side managed to stem a Thai attack that had scored six in the previous game. Thailand should have taken the lead in the 41st minute when Sarach Yooyen's free-kick was parried by Ramos Maxanches, but only a few yards out with no pressure and the whole goal to aim at Nurul Sriyankem some how managed to blast his shot way over. Thailand finally were able to capitalise on their vast dominance a minute before half-time as Chanathip Songkrasin's decisive pass was composedly finished by Rungrath Poomchantuek. In the second half Thailand had a great opportunity to double their lead when they were awarded a penalty kick after Nurul was tripped in the box in the 54th minute. Chananan Pombuppha had scored four in his previous game and was given the responsibility but Maxanches dove low to his right to save the shot. Timor-Leste defended well but offered little in attack as Thailand won by the single goal.

Vietnam vs Malaysia
Malaysia started strongly and could have scored in the first minute, goaltender Phí Minh Long having to produce a one-handed save to keep D. Saarvindran's free-kick from finding the back of the net. Võ Huy Toàn had a goal disallowed for offsides, but Vietnam opened the scoring five minutes later as Công Phượng was fouled in the box by Adam Nor Azlin and Mạc Hồng Quân scored from the resulting penalty kick. Công Phượng grabbed Vietnam's second goal just before hald time as he slotted Hồ Ngọc Thắng's pass into the bottom corner. Công Phượng was tormenting the Malaysian defence and won another penalty kick just moments into the second half as he was fouled by Mohd Farhan Abu Bakar this time, with Huy Toàn given the responsibilities and scoring. Incredibly only six minutes later Vietnam would score again, Công Phượng with a great free-kick into the top corner. Malaysia finally restored some pride as Nurridzuan Abu Hassan found space in the Vietnamese defence to cross for Syahrul Azwari Ibrahim to score. With ten minutes to go Vietnam restored their four-goal lead when Nguyễn Văn Toàn chipping the ball over Abu Bakar who was off his goal-line to cap off a resounding performance.

Timor-Leste vs Brunei
Brunei missed an excellent chance early on in the game as Md Aminuddin Zakwan Tahir's cross found Mohd Asnawi Syazni Aziz who could only head straight at Timorese goaltender Ramos Maxanches from point-blank range. They would come to rue that miss in the 24th minute as Jairo Neto slotted Nidio Neto through ball through the Bruneian goalkeeper's to open the scoring. Brunei found a way back in the 68th minute as Asnawi was fouled in the box by Maxanches. Captain Faiq Jefri Bolkiah took the responsibility and confidently smashed the penalty kick home to equalise. However just as in the previous game Brunei conceded again six minutes after equalising, from just outside the box the other Brazilian-born Timorese player in the squad Paulo Helber stole the ball from Muhd Saiful Ammar Hj Adis and unleashed a powerful effort and although Md Ahsanuddin Hj Md Dani got both hands to the shot he could not keep it out.

Malaysia vs Thailand
The match started at a frenetic pace as with in the first ten minutes Chanathip Songkrasin and Chananan Pombuppha had efforts go just wide. Malaysia too had their chances as a swift counterattack in the 14th minute saw captain Gary Steven Robbat racing towards goal but he shot wide under pressure from Narubadin Weerawatnodom. In the 27th minute Narubadin put in a great cross for the unmarked Thitipan Puangchan right in front off the goal but he somehow headed wide. Narubadin's crosses were troubling the Malaysians and it caused problems again in the 53rd minute as he crossed for Rungrath Poomchantuek and last ditch challenge was needed by Mohd Amer Saidin to prevent the latter from scoring. Malaysia almost took the lead five minutes later when Syahrul Azwari Ibrahim cut inside his defender and unleashed a tremendous curling effort destined for the top corner which Thai goalkeeper Chanin Sae-Eae had to be at full stretch to keep out. Thailand had an even better chance themselves in the 68th minute when Mohd Farhan Abu Bakar had to dive down low to keep Tanaboon Kesarat's long range effort out, and the rebound was pounced upon by Chananan but his shot was deflected by a Malaysian defender for a corner. But a goal did come nine minutes from time as Tristan Do passed to his captain Sarach Yooyen who from just outside the box unleashed a powerful left-footed effort that gave the Malaysian goalkeeper no chance. Thailand could have even scored another when Nurul Sriyankem was one-on-one with the goalkeeper but Abu Bakar managed to make the block. Nonetheless Thailand held on through six minutes of additional time to confirm the win.

Vietnam vs Laos

Thailand vs Brunei
Thailand fielded a starting line-up mostly of reserves against Brunei but still dominated the match and they scored in the 19th minute as Chenrop Samphaodi latched onto Thitipan Puangchan's through pass and slotted past the onrushing Bruneian goalkeeper. Chenrop would score again thirteen minutes later as he was completely unmarked to head in Chaowat Veerachat's cross. Rungrath Poomchantuek had a goal disallowed for offsides three minutes before that, but Thailand kept attacking and where rewarded with another goal six minutes after the break when Pakorn Prempak taped a free-kick to Thitipan who blasted the shot into the net. Tristan Do was next to score as the defender stole the ball from Suhaimi Anak Sulau and proceeded to shoot past Md Ahsanuddin Hj Md Dani although the Bruneian goalkeeper probably could have done better. He himself was injured on the play and had to be substituted, but his replacement Md Nur Syazwan Halidi could not stop another substitute Nurul Sriyankem from scoring in stoppage time as Thailand made it five. The result also guarantied Thailand would advance out of the group.

Timor-Leste vs Vietnam
Vietnam opened the scoring in the twelfth minute as Trần Phi Sơn headed in a cross from his captain Quế Ngọc Hải. The Timorese defence managed to keep the score at one nil for the rest of the first half, but five minutes into the second Mạc Hồng Quân headed in another goal, again from a Ngọc Hải cross. The Full-back then got himself on the score sheet seven minutes later as his shot from an acute angle rebounded off the far post and into the net. Vietnam where dominating and just three minutes later they scored their fourth goal; Ramos Maxanches managed to save Lê Thanh Bình's initial effort, but the rebound fell right to Võ Huy Toàn who smashed the ball in. The result saw Vietnam join Thailand in the semi-finals with a game to spare while in the process eliminating the other teams in the group.

Brunei vs Malaysia
Malaysia won 2-0 against their neighbours although it was a match with only pride to play for as both teams were already eliminated. In the 74th minute Nurridzuan Abu Hassan's long range free-kick took an awkward bounce to nestle in the far corner, and only six minutes Malaysia scored a second to wrap up the win as Adam Nor Azlin pounced on a rebound as the Bruneian goalkeeper could not hold on the initial shot

Timor-Leste vs Laos

Vietnam vs Thailand
Both teams were already qualified for the knockout round, and as expected a few key players such as Quế Ngọc Hải and Nguyễn Công Phượng of Vietnam and Chanathip Songkrasin and Sarach Yooyen of Thailand not included in the starting line-ups. Nonetheless there was still plenty to play for as the winner would top the group and both teams played a fast-paced, physical, and attacking game. Chananan Pombuppha had two great chances in the opening twenty minutes but on both occasions his effort was wide. Chananan redeemed himself in the 22nd minute as it was his pass that set up Pakorn Prempak to score the opening goal from an acute angle. Pakorn could have had a second eight minutes later when this time Chaowat Veerachat with the pass but the former's shot was straight at Vietnamese goalkeeper Phạm Văn Tiến. Just moments latter Vietnam had the chance to equalise but Phạm Mạnh Hùng's cross to the unmarked Đỗ Duy Mạnh was headed wide. In similar circumstances before the end of the half Trần Phi Sơn, whose pace and skill caused Thailand all sorts of problems, found Lê Thanh Bình with a great pass, but although the former was again unmarked he too headed off target. Thailand thought they had doubled their advantage in the 51st minute when Chaowat passed it to Chananan only for the latter to see his effort come off the woodwork. Nonetheless they would get their second when Pakorn who was adjudged to have been fouled in the box by Bùi Tiến Dũng. Thitipan Puangchan took the responsibility and calmly scored the penalty kick. With sixteen minutes to go Thanh Bình was denied by a sliding challenge from Thai captain Adisorn Promrak, and three minutes later it was three for Thailand as Tristan Do managed to turn the defender marking him before unleashing a powerful curling shot perfectly placed in the top corner. in the last minute of the game Vietnam would grab a consolation goal as Thanh Bình turned and volleyed a pass in spectacular style to make some amends for the chances he missed earlier in the game, as Thailand conceded their first goal of the tournament but still topped the group in an entertaining game.

Laos vs Malaysia

References

Group B